Armeria splendens is an ornamental plant in the family Plumbaginaceae, which is native to Europe.

External links
 Armeria splendens photos

splendens
Flora of Europe
Garden plants of Europe